Imdang Station is a station of Daegu Metro Line 2 in Imdang-dong and Jungbang-dong, Gyeongsan, North Gyeongsang Province, South Korea.

References

External links 

  Cyber station information from Daegu Metropolitan Transit Corporation

Daegu Metro stations
Gyeongsan
Railway stations opened in 2012
2012 establishments in South Korea